Nevada: A Novel is the debut novel from author Imogen Binnie, released by Topside Press in 2013. Nevada follows the adventures of transgender New York punk woman Maria Griffiths.

Background and publication 
Nevada was originally released by Topside Press in 2013. In June 2021 it was announced that Nevada would be reissued in Fall 2022 by MCD Books' FSG Originals due to its enduring popularity. Later that summer Binnie retweeted that Nevada would be published in June 2022 by Picador, making it available in the UK for the first time.

In 2022, Binnie appeared on Storybound reading an excerpt from "Nevada", complete with an original score and sound design by Jude Brewer.

Plot
When Maria finds out her girlfriend cheated on her, she spirals out of control, stealing her girlfriend's car and buying heroin before heading west on a journey of self-discovery. In Nevada, she meets James Hanson, and immediately realizes that James is also transgender, but doesn't realize it yet. The two travel to Reno together. Maria frequently lapses into long inner monologues throughout the book, reflecting on gender, heteronormativity, and social conditioning.

Inspiration
Binnie has said that in writing a story about a transgender protagonist, she wanted to resist the risk of explaining "The Trans Experience for cis people," which she says often happens with transgender memoirs. Because Nevada is a work of fiction, Binnie said she approached writing it as a transgender story written for trans women. "One of the questions I was trying to answer with Nevada was, what would a story about trans women that was intended for an audience of trans women — what would that look like?" Binnie told blogger Sarah McCarry in an interview about the book.

Reception
Nevada received a negative review in magazine Publishers Weekly, but inspired other trans women writers, like author Casey Plett, who says the book was "very bleak and it ends in a tough way," but ultimately made her feel that "nothing was off-limits" to write about. The book was also nominated for the 2014 Lambda Literary Award for transgender fiction.

Adaptation
On January 17th 2023 director Jane Shoenbrun announced a casting call on her Twitter seeking actors for a theatrical adaptation of Nevada. Imogen Binnie endorsed it with a retweet.

References

External links 
 Nevada at Topside Press (Wayback Machine)
  Nevada for purchase or free download
 Nevada at wikisource
 

American LGBT novels
Novels with lesbian themes
Novels with transgender themes
2013 American novels
2010s LGBT novels
2013 LGBT-related literary works
Creative Commons-licensed novels
2013 debut novels
Novels set in Nevada
Novels set in New York City